The Dodo is an American media brand and digital publisher focused on telling animals' stories. The Dodo is headquartered in New York City.

History
The Dodo was launched in January 2014 by Izzie Lerer, the daughter of media executive Kenneth Lerer, and journalist Kerry Lauerman. The company—named after the dodo, an extinct bird from the island of Mauritius— was founded by Lerer out of "a personal passion for the subject matter..." Lerer has a PhD in animal studies with a focus on animal ethics and human relationships from Columbia University, and launched the website after noticing the viral success of animal videos online but seeing no one "really owned the space." The Dodo became one of the most popular Facebook publishers, garnering 1 billion video views from the social network in November 2015, and was crowned the No. 1 animal brand on all of social media by the Webby Awards in 2019.

In late 2017, The Dodo launched "El Dodo," its first non-English language channel to reach Spanish speaking audiences. The Dodo's editorial and video production staff unionized with the Writers Guild of America, East in April 2018.

Expansion
The brand expanded into longer-form storytelling with its first TV series, "Dodo Heroes" on Animal Planet in June 2018, which went on to become the network's top-performing freshman series and was picked up for a second season in 2019. In June 2018, The Dodo held its first ever "Best Dog Day Ever" pop-up event in New York City, which attracted over 1400 dogs and their owners. Based on the one day event's success, The Dodo decided to expand the franchise in 2019 for a month-long "Best Dog Day Ever: Halloween Edition" event in the fall for Tri-State dogs.

In July 2019, The Dodo partnered with VidCon for the conference's first-ever co-programmed section, "The Dodo Pet Zone" featuring some of the Internet's most-famous animals. In the summer of 2019, the animal brand launched its children's brand, "Dodo Kids," with a new YouTube channel with launch sponsor Paramount Pictures' "Dora and the Lost City of Gold," and a bespoke content slate of new kids series including "Best Animal Friends," "Dodo Sing Dodo Dance," and "Rescued!". Soon thereafter, The Dodo announced its new Netflix Original series, "Izzy Bee's Koala World," which debuted in 2020.

In July 2019, The Dodo partnered with Instagram to develop an IGTV-first series for teens, "You Know Me... Now Meet My Pet," featuring young Instagram influencers and their pets. In September 2019, The Dodo pushed into children's book publishing with Scholastic with three books based on the video series. In April 2020 they debuted a new podcast called "An Animal Saved My Life" produced through iHeartRadio.

In March 2022, the brand expanded into pet insurance by debuting Fetch by The Dodo. Formerly Petplan, the insurance company and The Dodo partnered to create a pet insurance option that would appeal to The Dodo's audience of pet parents.

Accolades
They are the most "loved" publisher in the world on Toys for Tots (by "love" reactions). The animal brand won a Shorty Social Good award for Best Use of Facebook in 2017 and 2018; Shorty Award for Best in Pets and Animals; Webby Award for its social/animal content and another Shorty Social Good Award for Best Video Series for "Comeback Kids: Animal Edition."

References

External links

Digital mass media companies
Animal websites
Animal and pet magazines
Animals and humans
Animal welfare
Digital media
New media
American news websites
Online magazines published in the United States
Mass media companies of the United States
Online content distribution
American environmental websites
Environmental magazines
Magazines established in 2014
Internet properties established in 2014
2014 establishments in New York City
Mass media about Internet culture
Vox Media
Former Warner Bros. Discovery subsidiaries
Comcast subsidiaries